Chain Reaction is the official debut studio album by Cuban-American rapper Cuban Link on August 16, 2005 independently on his new label, M.O.B. Records & distributed by Universal.The album was preceded by the shelving of his major-label debut studio album "24K" in 2000.

Production
Chain Reaction boasts production from producers such as Swizz Beatz, Mr. Porter and others while featured guest artists include Avant, Don Omar, Zion, Cap 1, Mya, Jadakiss and Syleena Johnson. The CD was packaged as an "enhanced CD" with music videos, pictures and a teaser to his future DVD release, "Tale From the Bronx."

Track listing

Singles
"Sugar Daddy" (featuring Mya)
"Scandalous" (featuring Don Omar)
"Letter to Pun" (featuring One Solo)

These were the only three singles released off the album with videos shot for them. "Scandalous" peaked at number 45 on the "Hot Latin Tracks" Billboard chart in 2005 (Cuban Link chart history). The video to "Sugar Daddy" debuted on 106 & Park and the video to "Letter to Pun" is on the DVD.

Chart performance
Chain Reaction debuted at number 188 on the Billboard 200 albums chart on September 3, 2005.

References

2005 debut albums
Cuban Link albums
Albums produced by Swizz Beatz